Iwona Lewandowska-Bernardelli (born 19 February 1985) is a Polish long distance runner who specialises in the marathon. She competed in the women's marathon event at the 2016 Summer Olympics.

References

External links
 

1985 births
Living people
Polish female long-distance runners
Polish female marathon runners
People from Lipno, Lipno County
Athletes (track and field) at the 2016 Summer Olympics
Olympic athletes of Poland
20th-century Polish women
21st-century Polish women